Ras-related protein Rab-3C is a protein that in humans is encoded by the RAB3C gene.

Interactions 

Rab3C has been show to interact with ZWINT.

References

Further reading